Culpina Airport  is a high elevation airport serving the town of Culpina (de) in the Chuquisaca Department of Bolivia.

See also

Transport in Bolivia
List of airports in Bolivia

References

External links 
OpenStreetMap - Culpina
OurAirports - Culpina
Fallingrain - Culpina Airport

Airports in Chuquisaca Department